Gymnastics was contested at the 2013 Summer Universiade from July 7 to 10 at the Gymnastics Centre in Kazan, Russia. Artistic and rhythmic gymnastics was the two disciplines of gymnastics contested.

Medal summary

Medal table

Artistic gymnastics

Men's events

Women's events

Rhythmic gymnastics

Individual

Group

References

External links
2013 Summer Universiade – Artistic gymnastics
2013 Summer Universiade – Rhythmic gymnastics
Results book – Artistic gymnastics
Results book – Rhythmic gymnastics

 
Summer Universiade
2013
Gymnastics
Universiade